HP Lovecraft's The Tomb is a 2005 American horror film directed by Ulli Lommel and starring Victoria Ullmann, Christian Behm, Gerard Griesbaum, and Michael Barbour. It is supposedly based on H.P. Lovecraft's 1917 story, "The Tomb". 
However, the plot of the film is completely unrelated to the Lovecraft short story. The film was compared to the 2004 movie, Saw, and the series was mentioned on the box art. The film is also known simply as The Tomb, but the title on the DVD case is HP Lovecraft's The Tomb. However, on the film itself, the title is given as "H.P. Lovecraft The Tomb", with no apostrophe or 's'.

Plot
Tara (Victoria Ullmann) and Billy (Christian Behm) awake in a dark basement or warehouse, bloodied and covered with wounds. As they explore the empty surroundings, they find other wounded people who die in horrible ways at the hands of "The Puppetmaster," a sinister villain who plays a deadly game with them in which there will be only one survivor. H.P. Lovecraft is mentioned several times during the course of the film by some characters, and the 'Puppetmaster' is referred to as 'Charles Dexter Ward' and one of his victims as 'Pickman' (a reference to Lovecraft's story Pickman's Model). However these passing references to Lovecraftian characters (and a quote from one of Lovecraft's stories about going "beyond ye spheres") are largely irrelevant to the serial killer plot played out on screen.

Filming
Production of HP Lovecraft's The Tomb took place during August 2005 in Marina Del Rey, California, at a warehouse on Princeton Drive that has since been demolished. The scenes at the "Palm Desert Motel" were shot on an indoor set at the same warehouse. Exteriors were shot in the high desert near Palmdale, California.

Co-executive producer Jeff Frentzen is wearing the black gloves of the killer throughout the film.

References

External links

Movie trailer

2007 direct-to-video films
2007 horror films
Films directed by Ulli Lommel
2007 films
Films shot in California
Films scored by Robert J. Walsh
2000s English-language films